Kendell may refer to:

Kendell Airlines, regional airline in Australia
Kendell (surname)

See also
Kendel (disambiguation)
Kendal (disambiguation)
Kendall (disambiguation)